Drasteria pictoides is a moth of the family Erebidae. It is found in Syria and the southern Caucasus.

References

Drasteria
Moths described in 1989
Moths of the Middle East